Vilkas is a Lithuanian language family name. The word means "wolf" in Lithuanian.

The surname may refer to:

Eduardas Vilkas (1935-2008), Lithuanian economist and politician 
Pranas Vilkas, Lithuanian politician
Tuula Vilkas, Finnish speedskater

See also
Vilkas, a warrior and a lycanthrope in The Elder Scrolls V: Skyrim

Lithuanian-language surnames